The Diocese of Waiapu is one of the thirteen dioceses and hui amorangi of the Anglican Church in Aotearoa, New Zealand and Polynesia.  The Diocese covers the area around the East Coast of the North Island of New Zealand, including Tauranga, Taupo, Gisborne, Hastings and Napier. It is named for the Waiapu River.

The diocese was established in 1858. The seat of the Bishop is the Waiapu Cathedral of Saint John the Evangelist, Napier.

William Williams was appointed the first Bishop of Waiapu. His son, Leonard Williams,  and grandson, Herbert Williams, also held the position.

The most recently departed Bishop of Waiapu was David Rice, who was Bishop of Waiapu from 2008–2014, and who departed to become Bishop of San Joaquin in California. Andrew Hedge is the current bishop, having been installed on St Luke's Day, 18 October 2014.

Bishops
 1859–1876: William Williams
 1877–1894: Edward Stuart
 1895–1909: Leonard Williams
 1910–1914: Alfred Averill
 1914–1929: William Sedgwick
 from 1928 until the 1970s, the Bishop of Aotearoa was a suffragan bishop of Waiapu
 1930–1937: Herbert Williams
 1938–1944: George Gerard
 1945–1946: George Cruickshank
 1947–1971: Norman Lesser (also Archbishop of New Zealand from 1961)
 1971–1979: Paul Reeves
 1979–1983: Ralph Matthews
 1983–1990: Peter Atkins
 1989–2005: George Connor, assistant bishop; Regional Bishop "Bishop in the Bay of Plenty" (translated to Dunedin; Convening Bishop of the New Zealand dioceses, 1998–2006 and Co-Presiding Bishop / Pīhopa Aporei (Pākehā), 2004–2006)
 1991–2002: Murray Mills
 2002–2008: John Bluck
 2008–2014: David Rice
 2014–present: Andrew Hedge

Archdeaconries
In 1866, there were two archdeaconries: A. N. Brown was Archdeacon of Tauranga and Leonard Williams of Waiapu.

Archdeacon of Waiapu
1862–?: Leonard Williams
David Ruddock

Archdeacon of Tauranga
?–1884 (d.): Alfred Brown
Samuel Williams

References

External links
 Waiapu Anglicans – official website of the Diocese of Waiapu
 Diocese of Waiapu on the official website of the Anglican Church in Aotearoa, New Zealand and Polynesia

Religious organizations established in 1858
Waiapu
1858 establishments in New Zealand